Kaviratna Kalidasa is a 1983 Kannada-language historical drama film based on the life of Kālidāsa, a renowned Classical Sanskrit writer of the 4th Century A.D. The film was written and directed by Renuka Sharma and produced by V. S. Govinda. The film stars Rajkumar, portraying the title role of Kalidasa, along with Jaya Pradha in the role of Vidyadhare and Srinivasa Murthy as Raja Bhoja.

The film is considered to be one of the all-time top money-grossing films in the history of Kannada movies. It was distributed by Parvathamma Rajkumar under the Vajreshwari Combines banner. The movie saw a theatrical run of 25 weeks.

Plot

The kingdom's chief minister wants his son to marry the king's daughter, Princess Vidyadhare. When he expresses his wish to the king, he is ridiculed. Instead, the king orders him to search for a "Sakala Vidya Paarangatha" groom for his daughter. Vowing to take revenge against the insult, the minister goes in search of a foolish groom.

Kalidasa, a humble shepherd is shown rearing his sheep. Convinced of his stupidity, the minister charms Kalidasa to accompany him to the palace, so that Kalidasa can marry the princess. Coached by the minister, Kalidasa excels in the tests conducted by Vidyadhare (Jaya Pradha). The minister is shrewd enough to teach a key sentence to Kalidasa. If he can't answer a question, Kalidasa must utter "heluvudakku, keluvudakku, idu samayavalla" ("This isn't the right time to question or answer.")

Vidyadhare is fooled by Kalidasa's brilliance and marries him. However, the truth comes out during the first night. Shattered, Vidyadhare locks Kalidasa in the palace temple and gets him to demand "vidyaabuddhi" (knowledge and wisdom) from the goddess Kali. In a mystical scene, Vidyadhare loses consciousness, while Kalidasa is blessed with vidyaabuddhi.  Kalidasa is shown walking away from the palace-temple, implying his casting off his earlier ignorance  and walking away from his previous life. Vidyadhare regains consciousness and goes in search of her husband.

Kalidasa, now a renowned poet, is one of the astadiggajas (eight great poets including Daṇḍin) in the court of King Bhoja (Srinivasa Murthy), much to the ire of the elder poet Musuri Krishnamurthy. Bhoja pleads with his dear friend Kalidasa to write a charama geethe (burial song) for him. Kalidasa refuses, since Bhoja is sure to die once he hears the song. Vidyadhare assumes the name Kaladhare, rests at a prostitute Ratnakala's home and catches Kalidasa's attention. Vidyadhare is pleased to see her husband, but Kalidasa is unaware of his former life. Kalidasa composes his best work Abhignaanashaakuntala with romantic interests on Vidyadhare.

Bhoja can't bear the fact that his aptamitra (intimate friend) Kalidasa is in the company of a prostitute. The differences lead to Kalidasa parting ways with Bhoja and walking out of his court. Dimdima kavi, who is blessed with a dindima from the goddess Saraswati, throws a literary challenge to Bhoja's ashtadiggajas, asking them to complete his shloka with the answer. Bhoja recalls his friend, when none can answer the question, kamale kamlotpattitih (lotus is born in a lotus). Shamed Bhoja announces that he will donate half of his kingdom to anyone who solves the puzzle.  Ratnakala gets the answer from Kalidasa and poisons him. She walks into royal court, to claim half kingdom. She answers, "Eye lotuses in the face lotus of my lady."

Dimdima kavi, who could silence herds of laureates with his dimdima, catches her fault, asking when she herself is a lady, how can she say "milady." He announces that other than Kalidasa no one can answer this puzzle. Bhoja rushes the guards to Kalaadhare's house, only to find the dead body of Kalidasa. Bhoja also learns the truth from Vidyadhare: Kalidasa was her husband. Bhoja pledges to Vidyadhare that he'll get her husband back to her and prays to the goddess Kali to donate his half life to Kalidasa. When Kalidasa awakens, Bhoja hides himself and tricks him to sing "charama geethe."  Bhoja dies once his friend has completed the song.

The onus is now on Kalidasa to get his friend back to life; the only way is the divine intervention. He prays his heart out to the goddess Kali, who is touched by the love and affection Kalidasa and Bhoja bestow on each other. The goddess blesses both Kalidasa and Bhoja with long lives. The movie ends with Kalidasa reuniting with Vidyadhare.

Cast
 Rajkumar as Kalidasa and Dushyantha
 Jayapradha as Vidhyadhare and Shakuntala
 Srinivasa Murthy as Raja Bhoja
 Balakrishna as Mantri Gunasaagara
 Nalini (credited as Anandi) as Kaali Devi
 K. Vijaya as Rathnakale
 Master Arjun as Sarvadamana/Bharata
 Musuri Krishnamurthy as Kavi Rakshasa
 Vadiraj as Mari Rakshasa
 Shani Mahadevappa, cameo appearance as Dindima kavi
 Papamma as Gouthami

Soundtrack
The music for the film was composed by M. Ranga Rao and the lyrics of all the songs were written by Chi. Udaya Shankar ( except for Shyamala Dandaka written by Kalidasa which was used for Manikyaveena song). Rajkumar who was impressed by Mehdi Hassan's ghazal Nawazish Karam Shukriya, asked the music director to recreate the song, which resulted in Sadaa Kannale. The movie also included a sequence where all the
major works of Kalidasa are remembered.

References

External links
 

1980s Kannada-language films
Films set in ancient India
1983 films
Indian biographical films
Films scored by M. Ranga Rao
Films about Kalidasa
1980s biographical films
Films directed by Renuka Sharma